Portraits is the second studio album by Christian metalcore band For Today, released on June 9, 2009. The album charted on three of Billboards charts; No. 14 on Top Heatseekers, No. 15 on Christian Albums, and No. 40 on Top Independent Albums.

Track listing

Personnel 
For Today
 Mattie Montgomery – lead vocals
 Ryan Leitru - lead guitar, clean vocals (on tracks 8 and 10)
 Mike Reynolds - rhythm guitar
 Brandon Leitru - bass guitar
 David Morrison - drums, percussion

Production
Produced, Engineered, Mixed, and mastered by Jamie King
Artwork by Dave Quiggle
Guest vocals on "Immanuel (The Redeemer)" by Joe Musten from Advent
Additional guitar on "Benedictus (Song Of Zechariah)" by Dustie Waring from Between The Buried And Me

References 

2009 albums
For Today albums
Facedown Records albums
Albums produced by Jamie King (record producer)